Newcomb House may refer to:

in the United States
(by state then city)
Newcomb House (Pasadena, California), listed on the National Register of Historic Places (NRHP) in Los Angeles County
Richard F. Newcomb House, Quincy, Illinois, listed on the National Register of Historic Places listings in Adams County
Newcomb Place, Quincy, Massachusetts, listed on the NRHP in Norfolk County
John Newcomb House, Wellfleet, Massachusetts, listed on the NRHP in Barnstable County
Newcomb House (Carthage, Missouri)
Van Horn-Newcomb House, Englewood, New Jersey, listed on the NRHP in Bergen County
Newcomb-Brown Estate, Pleasant Valley, New York, listed on the NRHP in Dutchess County